Livenka may refer to:
Livenka (music), Russian variety of accordion
Livenka (rural locality), name of several rural localities in Russia
Livenka (river), a river in Oryol Oblast, Russia